Andrea Duro Flores (born 14 October 1991) is a Spanish actress. She is known for playing the lead role in the series Física o Química.

Career 
In 2007, Duro started her career with fifteen years in the Spanish television series Cuestión de sexo.

From 2008 to 2011, she rose to fame with her role as Yolanda "Yoli" Freire Carballar in the Spanish television series Física o Química.

In 2010, she posed in the British magazine FHM. In 2010, she made her film debut in the Spanish movie Three Steps Above Heaven.

In 2012, she joined the Spanish television series El secreto de Puente Viejo.

In 2016, she had a cast appearance with Ruth Núñez in the ninth season of La que se avecina.

In January 2019, it was ended the filming of the TV series Promesas de arena, starring Andrea Duro and Blanca Portillo.

In 2020, it is confirmed that the actress will give life to Yolanda "Yoli" Freire Carballar in Física o químicaː El reencuentro for the platform Atresplayer Premium, where she and Maxi Iglesias are the protagonists.

Personal life 
From 2011 to 2014, Andrea Duro was in a relationship with the Spanish actor Joel Bosqued.

From 2019-2021, Andrea Duro was in a relationship with the Cuban model Juan Betancourt.

Filmography

Television

Movies

Television Programs

Theater

Videoclips

Awards and nominations

References

External links 
  

1991 births
Living people
Actresses from Madrid
Spanish film actresses
Spanish television actresses
21st-century Spanish actresses